Signal Transduction and Targeted Therapy is a multidisciplinary peer-reviewed open access scientific journal covering biomedical research with a particular focus on signal transduction and its application to the drug development process. It was established in 2016 and is published by Nature Research. The editors-in-chief are Carlo M. Croce (Ohio State University), Kang Zhang (Macau University of Science and Technology), and Yu-Quan Wei (West China Medical Center). According to the Journal Citation Reports, the journal has a 2020 impact factor of 18.187.

References

Nature Research academic journals
Publications established in 2016
Pharmacology journals
English-language journals
Open access journals